Shahrekord shohada International Airport  is an airport in Shahrekord, Chaharmahal & Bakhtiari, Iran.

Shahrekord Airport is the highest airport in Iran with 6723 ft height. It locates at 3 kilometers south of the city. The airport was operated on 1999 .

The first domestic flight was in July 1999 by Iran Air Tours airline to Tehran, and first international flight was on 25 September 2002 to Kuwait International Airport.

It has an Asphalt runway that length 3298 meters and 45 meters width, and a taxiway with 23×285 meters dimensions.

Airlines and destinations

References

 

Airports in Iran
Buildings and structures in Chaharmahal and Bakhtiari Province
Transportation in Chaharmahal and Bakhtiari Province